Caledon can refer to:

South Africa
 Caledon, Western Cape, a town in South Africa
 Caledon River in South Africa

Elsewhere
 Caledon, County Tyrone in Northern Ireland
 Caledon, Ontario in Canada
 Caledon Bay in Arnhem Land, in the Northern Territory of Australia
 Caledon Shipbuilding & Engineering Company, a place in Scotland

Other
 Caledon, an alternate name of the Mandora, a musical instrument

See also
 Calydon, an ancient Greek city
 Calydon (genus), a genus of beetles
 Caledonia